Triteuta (230–219 BC) was an Illyrian queen and the first wife of the Illyrian king Agron of the Ardiaei (r. 250–231 BC), with whom she had a son named Pinnes.

Sometime before his death (231/230 BC), Agron divorced Triteuta and married Teuta. Their son, crown prince Pinnes, was placed under the guardianship of step-mother Teuta (the Queen regent) until after the First Illyrian War (228 BC). 

According to Dio Chrysostom, Demetrius of Pharos married Triteuta and became regent for Pinnes, after the war, thus becoming the most powerful of the Illyrian rulers in the 220s BC.

References

Sources

Illyrian queens
3rd-century BC women